Gunnedah Airport  is a small airport located  north of Gunnedah, New South Wales, Australia.

History
An aerodrome was first proposed in 1946 and Liverpool Plains Shire Council agreed to construction by public subscription in 1949. It was officially opened on 12 May 1951.

See also
List of airports in New South Wales

References 

Airports in New South Wales